Millstone is an unincorporated community in Calhoun County, West Virginia, United States.  It lies along U.S. Route 33 at the point where West Virginia Route 16 heads northward, to the south of the town of Grantsville, the county seat of Calhoun County.   Its elevation is 810 feet (247 m).  It has a post office with the ZIP code 25261.

References

Unincorporated communities in Calhoun County, West Virginia
Unincorporated communities in West Virginia